Tanac may refer to 
The Hebrew Bible
 Tanac, Croatia, a village 
Joyce Tanac (born 1950), American gymnast